Älvsbyn (translating to "the river village") is a locality and the seat of Älvsbyn Municipality in Norrbotten County, Sweden with 4,967 inhabitants in 2010. It is known as "The Pearl of Norrbotten".

Älvsbyn has a railway station that is served by trains running between Boden and Stockholm along the Swedish east coast. It has a youth hostel with a small recreational park, including a swimming pool.

Climate
Älvsbyn is as its name suggest located right on the Pite River. Being in a relatively deep valley by Swedish standards, the location is prone to temperature inversion. As a result, diurnal temperature variation is usually high and winter nights can be extremely cold and average near the coldest among Swedish municipal seats. Under the Köppen system, Älvsbyn has a subarctic climate with four pronounced seasons. The inland location warms summer up compared to coastal areas nearby, whereas winters are highly variable depending on wind patterns.

Sports
The following sports clubs are located in Älvsbyn:

 Älvsby IF

References 

Municipal seats of Norrbotten County
Swedish municipal seats
Populated places in Älvsbyn Municipality
Norrbotten